The Blériot 67 was a First World War French heavy bomber designed and built by Blériot for a 1916 competition Concours des Avions Puissants. Only a single prototype was built.

The Blériot 67 was a large equal-span biplane with a fuselage braced between the two wings, the four  Gnome 9B rotary engines were mounted as close to the centreline as possible, two on the upper wing leading edge and two on the lower wing. It had a biplane tail with three fins and a fixed conventional landing gear with twin-wheel main units.  It was first flown on 18 September 1916 but crashed on landing and was destroyed.

Specifications

References
Notes

Bibliography

1910s French bomber aircraft
67
Four-engined tractor aircraft
Biplanes
Aircraft first flown in 1916
Rotary-engined aircraft
Four-engined piston aircraft